Blécourt is the name of the following communes in France:

 Blécourt, Haute-Marne, in the Haute-Marne department
 Blécourt, Nord, in the Nord department